Tricking the Government is a 1914 American silent film produced by Sid Films and distributed by Warner's Features. It was directed by Sidney Olcott with Valentine Grant and Arthur Donaldson in the leading roles.

Cast
 Valentine Grant - 
 Arthur Donaldson -

Production notes
The film was shot in Florida.

External links

Tricking the Government website dedicated to Sidney Olcott

1914 films
American silent short films
Films directed by Sidney Olcott
1910s crime drama films
American crime drama films
1914 short films
American black-and-white films
1914 drama films
1910s American films
Silent American drama films
1910s English-language films